Chhaprabhatha is a part of the Katargam zone (North Zone) in Surat Municipal Corporation

Demographics
According to the India census , Chhaprabhatha had a population of 23,411. Males constitute 57% of the population and females 43%. Chhaprabhatha has an average literacy rate of 73%, higher than the national average of 59.5%; with male literacy of 78% and female literacy of 66%. 14% of the population is under 6 years of age.

References

See also 
List of tourist attractions in Surat

Suburban area of Surat
Cities and towns in Surat district